Bill Inglis may refer to:

 Bill Inglis (ice hockey) (born 1943), ice hockey centre
 Bill Inglis (footballer, born 1894) (1894–1968), Scottish footballer
 Bill Inglis (footballer, born 1899) (1899–1977), English footballer and manager

See also
 William Inglis (disambiguation)